Kasadera Kannon, also known as Ryūfuku-ji (笠覆寺) is a Buddhist temple located in Minami-ku, Nagoya in central Japan.

It is a part of the Owari Thirty-three Kannon.

History 
The temple was established by the Shingon sect. The temple has a Niōmon entrance gate, a number of small subsidiary temples and a pagoda which is two storeys high. Kasadera Kannon stages a Spring-time Setsubun festival on February 3 each year and a temple flea market on the 18th of every month.

The closest stop by public transport is Moto-Kasadera Station with the Meitetsu Nagoya Main Line.

External links 

Homepage of Kasadera Kannon

Buddhist temples in Nagoya